Pythagorean, meaning of or pertaining to the ancient Ionian mathematician, philosopher, and music theorist Pythagoras, may refer to:

Philosophy
 Pythagoreanism, the esoteric and metaphysical beliefs purported to have been held by Pythagoras
 Neo-Pythagoreanism, a school of philosophy reviving Pythagorean doctrines that became prominent in the 1st and 2nd centuries AD
 Pythagorean diet, the name for vegetarianism before the nineteenth century

Mathematics
 Pythagorean theorem
 Pythagorean triple
 Pythagorean prime
 Pythagorean trigonometric identity
 Table of Pythagoras, another name for the multiplication table

Music
 Pythagorean comma
 Pythagorean hammers
 Pythagorean tuning

Other uses
 Pythagorean cup
 Pythagorean expectation, a baseball statistical term
 Pythagorean letter

See also
 List of things named after Pythagoras